Northwoods Community Secondary School (NCSS) was an American charter school in Rhinelander, Wisconsin. Founded in 2003, the school offered a project-based curriculum.

In 2011 the Rhinelander Environmental Stewardship Academy was moved to NCSS due to a significant decrease in enrollment and the resignation of the head teacher.

Despite the passing of a 2010 referendum to keep NCSS at its location, it was decided in 2012 that the school would be moved to the Rhinelander High School.

The school closed at the end of the 2017 school year.

Curriculum
Northwoods Community Secondary School offered public enrollment to approximately 90 students between 6th and 12th grade. The curriculum was independent project-based learning, as an alternative to lecture-based instruction. Students were required to develop projects in order to meet the academic requirements of the Wisconsin Department of Public Instruction. The students worked at their own pace to complete their work. Math and language arts seminars were held twice weekly. Students received credits based on performance rather than grades. Students were required to earn seven credits per year (700 hours of work, plus 25 hours of community service and  50 hours of physical education).

Community service 
Each NCSS Student was required to perform 25 hours of community service per school year. Community service projects included:
 Grace Lodge: “Adopt a Grand Parent”
 Operation Clean Up, or "OCU", where students raked and snow shoveled for the neighboring houses
 Working at the Rhinelander Area Food Pantry
 Working at St. Joe's Thrift Shop
 Mural painting
 Senior Center: Helping the elderly
 Contributing to the Rhinelander animal shelter
 Wisconsin Department of Natural Resources: Cleaning the river front
 City Hall: Archive organizing
 Rhinelander Historical House Tours during the Courthouse Centennial Celebration (2008)
 Community garden
 Veterans Day program
 Senior (citizen) Prom with the Kids In Need Foundation
 Tree Haven: “A Tree for Tomorrow”

Gallery

References 

Schools in Oneida County, Wisconsin
Charter schools in Wisconsin
Public high schools in Wisconsin
Public middle schools in Wisconsin
Rhinelander, Wisconsin